The Falling Walls Science Summit (previously Falling Walls Conference) is an annual science event in Berlin, Germany, which takes place between 7 and 9 November and coincides with the anniversary of the Fall of the Berlin Wall. Guided by the question "Which are the next walls to fall in science and society?" the Science Summit aims to showcase scientific breakthroughs, foster a dialogue between science and general public and connect global leaders from science, business, and media to develop solutions for the greatest challenges of our time. Originally being a one-day conference, the summit has expanded and now includes three days: Falling Walls Pitches on 7 November (pitches from up-and-coming scientists, science start-ups, and science engagers), Falling Walls Circle on 8 November (round table debates between global leaders from science, politics, and business) and Falling Walls Breakthrough Day on 9 November (keynotes of the Falling Walls Science Breakthrough of the Year laureates and renowned international speakers).

Notable speakers

2017
Alexander Betts, University of Oxford
Sarah Chayes, Carnegie Endowment for International Peace
Esther Duflo, Massachusetts Institute of Technology (MIT)
Dennis Lo, Chinese University of Hong Kong
W.E. Moerner, Stanford University
Jian-Wei Pan, University of Science and Technology of China
Edgar Pieterse, University of Cape Town
Jürgen Schmidhuber, Swiss AI Lab
Christina Smolke, Stanford University

2016
Quarraisha Abdool Karim, CAPRISA, Durban
Kevin Bales, University of Nottingham
Neil Gershenfeld, Massachusetts Institute of Technology
Rob Knight, University of California, San Diego
Lim Chuan Poh, A*STAR, Singapore
Randolph Nesse, Arizona State University
Peter Neumann, King's College London
Hélène Rey, London Business School
Katherine Richardson, University of Copenhagen
Eyal Weizman, Goldsmiths, University of London

2015
June Andrews, University of Stirling, UK 
Bruce A. Beutler, University of Texas Southwestern Medical Center, USA 
Emmanuelle Charpentier, Max Planck Institute for Infection Biology, Germany
Ottmar Edenhofer, Potsdam Institute for Climate Impact Research, Germany
Nilüfer Göle, École des Hautes Études en Sciences Sociales, France 
Demis Hassabis, Google DeepMind, London, UK
Dirk Helbing, ETH Zurich, Switzerland 
Naila Kabeer, London School of Economics and Political Science, UK
Wolfgang Ketterle, Massachusetts Institute of Technology, USA
Nina Kraus, Northwestern University, USA
Joanne Liu, Médecins Sans Frontières, Switzerland 
Saskia Sassen, Columbia University, New York City
Brian Schmidt, Australian National University
Jackie Yi-Ru Ying, Institute of Bioengineering and Nanotechnology, Singapore
Jean-Pierre Bourguignon, President, European Research Council (Session Host)
Rush D. Holt, CEO, American Association for the Advancement of Science (Session Host) 
Johanna Wanka, German Federal Minister of Education and Research (Official Opening)

2014 
David Chipperfield, David Chipperfield Architects 
Karl Deisseroth, Stanford University, USA 
Stefan Hell, Max Planck Institute for Biophysical Chemistry, Germany 
Lisa Kaltenegger, Cornell University, USA
Christof Koch, Allen Institute for Brain Science, USA 
Nathan S. Lewis, California Institute of Technology, USA 
Mariana Mazzucato, University of Sussex, UK 
Svante Pääbo, Max Planck Institute for Evolutionary Anthropology, Germany
Alan Rusbridger, Former Editor-in-Chief of The Guardian, UK
Thierry Zomahoun, African Institute for Mathematical Sciences (AIMS), South Africa
Anton Zeilinger, University of Vienna, Austria 
Diane Griffin, vice-president of the United States National Academy of Sciences (Session Host) 
Angela Merkel, Chancellor of the Federal Republic of Germany (Official Opening) 
Sir Paul Nurse, President of the Royal Society, UK (Session Host)
Rupert Stadler, CEO, AUDI AG, Germany (Dinner speech) 
Philippe Taquet, President of the French Academy of Sciences (Session Host) 
Lev Zelenyi, Vice President of the Russian Academy of Sciences (Session Host)

2013 
Jagdish N. Bhagwati, Columbia University, USA
Olafur Eliasson, artist
Jill Farrant, University of Cape Town, South Africa
Stephen Friend, President Sage Bionetworks, USA 
Anita Goel, CEO Nanobiosym, USA 
Rolf-Dieter Heuer, CERN, Switzerland
Jules A. Hoffmann, Université de Strasbourg, France 
Robert P. Kirshner, Harvard University, USA
Daniel G. Nocera, Harvard University, USA
Onora O'Neill, Baroness O'Neill of Bengarve, University of Cambridge, UK
Mark Pagel, University of Reading, UK
Dan Shechtman, Technion – Israel Institute of Technology, Israel
Salil Shetty, Secretary General Amnesty International, UK 
Luc Steels, Universitat Pompeu Fabra Barcelona, Spain
Ai Weiwei, artist

2012 
David Awschalom, University of California, Santa Barbara
Monique Breteler, Harvard School of Public Health in Boston
Michael Bruter, London School of Economics
Philip Campbell, Nature Publishing Group
Awa Marie Coll-Seck, Senegal's Health Minister
David Harel, The Weizmann Institute of Science, Israel
Michel D. Kazatchkine, UN Special Envoy for HIV/Aids in Eastern Europe and Central Asia
Alan I. Leshner, AAAS and Science
Daniel Libeskind, Architect
Helga Nowotny, European Research Council (ERC), Vienna
Ina Schieferdecker, Fraunhofer FOKUS/Technische Universität Berlin
Hal Varian, Google Inc.
Daniel Zajfman, Weizmann Institute of Science, Israel

2011
Anastasia Ailamaki, École Polytechnique Fédérale de Lausanne 
Nick Barton, Institute of Science and Technology, Austria
Aaron Ciechanover, Technion
Robert Darnton, Harvard University
Ingrid Daubechies, Duke University
Robert E. Horn, Stanford University
Wang Hui, Tsinghua University, Beijing
Mary Kaldor, London School of Economics
Ferenc Krausz, Max Planck Institute for Quantum Optics Munich
Angela Merkel, Chancellor of the Federal Republic of Germany
Helga Nowotny, European Research Council (ERC), Vienna
Kõji Omi, The Science and Technology in Society (STS) forum Kyoto
Annette Schavan, German Federal Minister of Education and Research
Dennis J. Snower, the Kiel Institute for the World Economy
Cédric Villani, Université de Lyon
Stewart Wallis, nef (the new economics foundation), London

2010 
Dalton Conley, Sociologist
Frederick Cooper, historian
Helmut Dosch, Physicist
Olafur Eliasson, artist
Doug Guthrie, Dean of The George Washington University School of Business
Olga Holtz, mathematician
Reinhard Hüttl, President at acatech
Thomas Lengauer, Director at the Max Planck Institute for Informatics
Yves Leterme, Prime Minister of Belgium
Karl Ulrich Mayer, President of the Leibniz Association 
Jürgen Mlynek, President of the Helmholtz Association 
Annette Schavan, professor, German Federal Minister of Education and Research
Sabine Schmidtke, professor, Center for Advanced Judaic Studies, University of Pennsylvania
Christian Wulff, President of Germany

2009
Jutta Allmendinger
Alain Aspect
Michel Brunet
Dipesh Chakrabarty 
John-Dylan Haynes 
Rolf-Dieter Heuer
Harold James (historian) 
Angela Merkel
Amélie Mummendey
Miguel Nicolelis 
Tricia Striano 
Wendelin Werner 
Thomas Wiegand 
Muhammad Yunus

References 

 Central Science: More Falling Walls
 Cern Document Server: Falling Walls
 Scientific American: How science helped bring down the Berlin Wall
 Scientific American: Walls to fall: 6 ideas at the intellectual frontier, from business models based on selflessness to glasses -free 3-D TV
 Physicsworld.com: Breaking down walls in science
 REGIERUNGonline: Rede von Bundeskanzlerin Merkel auf der Konferenz "Falling Walls"
 Tagesspiegel: Die Leute wollen Cola classic
 Tagesspiegel: Kontakt mit der Zukunft
 WISSENSlogs: Falling Walls
 Welt der Physik: Falling Walls 2009 – von Menschen und Mauern
 Handelsblatt: Zukunftskonferenz in Berlin: Was die Wissenschaft verspricht
 Die Welt: Mauerfall auch in der Forschung angemahnt
 Berliner Morgenpost: Auch in der Forschung sollen Mauern fallen
 Berliner Zeitung: Der Traum vom besseren Leben, as well published in Frankfurter Rundschau: Der Traum vom besseren Leben
 BerliNews: Einstei'n bitte
 After the U.S. Election, What's Next for Science?
 No more walls
 Falling Walls Lab comes to Manchester

External links 
 Falling Walls – Official Site

Science conferences